Thomas Lynch (born 1948 in Detroit, Michigan) is an American poet, essayist, and undertaker.

Early life
Lynch was educated by nuns and Christian Brothers at Brother Rice High School in Bloomfield Hills, Michigan. Lynch then went to university and mortuary school, from which he graduated in 1973. He took over his father's funeral home in Milford, Michigan in 1974, a job he has held ever since. Lynch married in 1972 and divorced in 1984. He later remarried to Mary Tata in 1991. He has a daughter and three sons.

In 1970 Lynch went to Ireland for the first time, to find his family and read William Butler Yeats and James Joyce, an experience he recounts in his book Booking Passage: We Irish and Americans. He has returned many times since then, and now owns the small cottage in West Clare that was the home of his great-great-grandfather, and which was given as a wedding gift in the 19th century. He spends a portion of each year there.

Awards
His collection of essays, The Undertaking: Life Studies from the Dismal Trade, won the Heartland Prize for non-fiction, the American Book Award, and was a finalist for the National Book Award. It has been translated into seven languages. A second collection of essays, Bodies in Motion and at Rest, won the Great Lakes Book Award.

International recognition
Lynch's work has appeared in The New Yorker, Poetry, The Paris Review, Harper's, Esquire, Newsweek, The Washington Post, The New York Times, The Los Angeles Times, The Irish Times, and The Times. His commentaries have been recorded and broadcast by BBC Radio, RTÉ and NPR. His work has been the subject of two documentary films. "Learning Gravity" directed by Kathel Black for Little Bird Productions UK aired on the BBC and RTÉ. PBS Frontline's "The Undertaking" a film by Karen O'Conner and Miri Navasky aired in October 2007 on PBS stations nationwide. It won the 2008 Emmy Award for Arts and Culture Documentary.

Lynch is the recipient of grants and awards from the National Endowment for the Arts, the Michigan Council for the Arts, the Michigan Library Association, the Writers Voice Project, the National Book Foundation, the Arvon Foundation and the Arts Council of Ireland. He has read and lectured at universities and literary centers throughout Europe, the United Kingdom, Ireland, Australia, New Zealand and the United States. Lynch is also a regular presenter to professional conferences of funeral directors, hospice and medical ethics professionals, clergy, educators, and business leaders. He is an Adjunct Professor in the graduate creative writing program at the University of Michigan, Ann Arbor. He has appeared on C-SPAN, MSNBC, The Today Show, and the PBS Bill Moyers series, On Our Own Terms.

Works

Poetry
 Skating with Heather Grace. Knopf. 1987.
 
 
 
 The Sin-eater: A Breviary. Parclete Press. 2013. / Salmon Publishing (Ireland). 2012.

Fiction

Non-Fiction

Anthologies

References

External links
 Thomas Lynch website
 Audio: Thomas Lynch reads "Euclid" from Walking Papers: Poems 1999 - 2009
 Audio: 2001 Thomas Lynch reads his poems & essays, RealAudio
 Video: Thomas Lynch discusses the business of death on display at a funeral directors convention. An excerpt from the documentary, HOW TO LIVE FOREVER.
 PBS: Frontline "The Undertaking"

1948 births
Living people
20th-century American poets
American funeral directors
Writers from Detroit
21st-century American poets
University of Michigan faculty
People from Milford, Michigan
American Book Award winners